Yasmin Abdel Aziz (born 16 January 1980) is an Egyptian actress.

Biography
Abdel Aziz started in commercials at the age of 12 because of one of her mother's friends who owns a company of commercials. After a while she started to act in cinema and television with a series named A Woman From The Love Time that was a huge success all around the Middle East. After this success she made another mini-series called Kids Are Going Crazy.

Abdel Aziz focused in the last period on showing in cinema movies more than television movies while the other actresses of her generations were not, and she made her second big success by appearing with the comedian Ahmed Helmi in a romantic comedy named Zaki-Chan, which made very big gains in the box-office in its first week.

In 2001, she made a movie with Ashraf Abdel Baqi called Rasha Gareea and another in 2005 with Mostafa Qamar named Hareem Karim, which talks about a broken hearted woman who thought that her husband cheated on her when he did not so he tries to tell her the truth by calling his college. She also starred in dramatic movies like Farhan Molazem Adam and Qalb Gariee.

Personal life
The actress married Egyptian businessman Mohamed Nabil Halawa in 2001, with whom she has two children, Yasmin and Seif-eldin, but the couple divorced in 2018. In 2020, the actress struck the media with the news of her relationship with Egyptian former Handball player and Actor Ahmed El-Awady, whom she married in December 2019.

Filmography
 Gala Gala (2001)
 Rashshah Gari'ah (2001)
 Qalb Gari' (2002)
 Kedah Okeh (2003) 
 Saye Bahr (2004)
 Farhan Molazem Adem (2005)
 Harim Karim (2005)
 Zaki Chan (2005)
 1/8 Dastet Ashrar (2006)
 El Rahinah (2006)
 Haha W Toffahah (2006)
 Esabet El Doctor Omar (2007)
 Karkar (2007)
 El Dada Dudi (2008)
 Ethalathah Yashtaghelonaha (2010)
 El Anesah Mami (2012)
 Gawaza Miri (2014)
 Abu Shanab (2016)
 harbanah menha (2017)
 El Abla Tamtam (2018)
 L Akher Nafas (2019)
 W Nheb Tani Leh (2020)
 Elli Malosh Kebir (2021)

References

External links

1980 births
Living people
Egyptian film actresses
Egyptian television actresses
Actresses from Cairo